The annual World Energy Outlook (WEO) is the International Energy Agency's (IEA) flagship publication on global energy projections and analysis. It contains medium to long-term energy market projections, extensive statistics, analysis and advice for both governments and the energy business regarding energy security, environmental protection and economic development. The first WEO was published in 1977 and it has been an annual publication since 1998.

The World Energy Outlook uses three scenarios to examine future energy trends. The Net Zero Emissions by 2050 Scenario is normative, in that it is designed to achieve specific outcomes – an emissions trajectory consistent with keeping the temperature rise in 2100 below 1.5 °C (with a 50% probability), universal access to modern energy services and major improvements in air quality – and shows a pathway to reach it. The Announced Pledges Scenario, and the Stated Policies Scenario are exploratory, in that they define a set of starting conditions, such as policies and targets, and then see where they lead based on model representations of energy systems, including market dynamics and technological progress. The scenarios are not predictions but enable policy-makers and other readers to compare different possible versions of the future and the levers and actions that produce them, with the aim of stimulating insights about the future of global energy.

Since 1993, the IEA has provided medium- to long-term energy projections using a continually-evolving set of modelling tools. In 2021, the IEA adopted the Global Energy and Climate Model to develop the world's first comprehensive study of how to transition to an energy system at net zero CO2 emissions by 2050. This model is now the principle tool used to generate detailed sector-by-sector and region-by-region long-term scenarios for the World Energy Outlook and other IEA publications.

World Energy Outlook Reports by Year

[1] IEA (2000), World Energy Outlook 2000, IEA, Paris https://www.iea.org/reports/world-energy-outlook-2000, License: CC BY 4.0

[2] IEA (2002), World Energy Outlook 2002, IEA, Paris https://www.iea.org/reports/world-energy-outlook-2002, License: CC BY 4.0

[3] IEA (2003), World Energy Outlook 2003, IEA, Paris https://www.iea.org/reports/world-energy-outlook-2003, License: CC BY 4.0

[4] IEA (2005), World Energy Outlook 2005, IEA, Paris https://www.iea.org/reports/world-energy-outlook-2005, License: CC BY 4.0

[5] IEA (2007), World Energy Outlook 2007, IEA, Paris https://www.iea.org/reports/world-energy-outlook-2007, License: CC BY 4.0

[6] IEA (2008), World Energy Outlook 2008, IEA, Paris https://www.iea.org/reports/world-energy-outlook-2008, License: CC BY 4.0

[7] IEA (2009), World Energy Outlook 2009, IEA, Paris https://www.iea.org/reports/world-energy-outlook-2009, License: CC BY 4.0

[8] IEA (2010), World Energy Outlook 2010, IEA, Paris https://www.iea.org/reports/world-energy-outlook-2010, License: CC BY 4.0

[9] IEA (2011), World Energy Outlook 2011, IEA, Paris https://www.iea.org/reports/world-energy-outlook-2011, License: CC BY 4.0

[10] IEA (2014), World Energy Outlook 2014, IEA, Paris https://www.iea.org/reports/world-energy-outlook-2014, License: CC BY 4.0

[11] IEA (2017), World Energy Outlook 2017, IEA, Paris https://www.iea.org/reports/world-energy-outlook-2017, License: CC BY 4.0

[12] IEA (2018), World Energy Outlook 2018, IEA, Paris https://www.iea.org/reports/world-energy-outlook-2018, License: CC BY 4.0

[13] IEA (2020), World Energy Outlook 2020, IEA, Paris https://www.iea.org/reports/world-energy-outlook-2020, License: CC BY 4.0

[14] IEA (2022), World Energy Outlook 2022, IEA, Paris https://www.iea.org/reports/world-energy-outlook-2022, License: CC BY 4.0 (report); CC BY NC SA 4.0 (Annex A)

See also

 World energy supply and consumption

References

External links
 
 The International Energy Agency
 Articles on energy in the OECD Observer
 World Energy Outlook 2007: "Everything is Getting Worse" Interview with Fatih Birol, IEA chief economist

Energy policy
Energy economics
International Energy Agency